Jonathan Clark (born 5 May 1981) is a South African cricketer. He played in four first-class and two List A matches for Boland in 2004 and 2005.

See also
 List of Boland representative cricketers

References

External links
 

1981 births
Living people
South African cricketers
Boland cricketers
Cricketers from Paarl